Springfield is a home rule-class city in and county seat of Washington County, Kentucky, United States. The population was 2,846 at the 2020 census.

History
Springfield was established in 1793 and probably named for springs in the area.

The home of Senator John Pope, Richard Berry Jr. House and the Mordecai Lincoln House are historic houses in Springfield listed on the National Register of Historic Places.

Springfield, noted by filmmakers as Hollywood South, is the site of Kentucky's first and only movie sound stage. The Springfield Bonded Film Complex came about as a part of the burgeoning film industry in Kentucky, ushered in by the state's film tax credit. This tax credit has the distinction as the most generous in the nation.

Geography
Springfield is located at  (37.686328, -85.221955). Springfield is located approximately 15 miles east of Bardstown, 10 miles north of Lebanon, and 17 miles west of Danville.

Demographics

As of the census of 2000, there were 2,634 people, 1,166 households, and 711 families residing in the city. The racial makeup of the city was 74.68% White, 22.40% African American, 0.53% Asian, 0.80% from other races, and 1.59% from two or more races. Hispanic or Latino of any race were 1.25% of the population.

There were 1,166 households, out of which 25.6% had children under the age of 18 living with them, 42.3% were married couples living together, 16.6% had a female householder with no husband present, and 39.0% were non-families. 37.2% of all households were made up of individuals, and 19.6% had someone living alone who was 65 years of age or older.  The average household size was 2.20 and the average family size was 2.88.

21.8% of the population was under the age of 18, 7.7% from 18 to 24, 24.9% from 25 to 44, 22.7% from 45 to 64, and 22.9% who were 65 years of age or older.  The median age was 42 years. For every 100 females, there were 78.3 males.  For every 100 females age 18 and over, there were 72.9 males.

The median income for a household in the city was $24,430, and the median income for a family was $35,143. Males had a median income of $29,917 versus $21,865 for females. The per capita income for the city was $16,793.  About 12.3% of families and 16.0% of the population were below the poverty line, including 16.6% of those under age 18 and 22.3% of those age 65 or over.

Education
Springfield has a lending library, the Washington County Public Library.

Notable people

 Lemuel Boulware, General Electric's vice president of labor and community relations from 1956 until 1961, whose policy of bargaining became known as "Boulwarism"
 Paul Derringer,  MLB pitcher for the St. Louis Cardinals, Cincinnati Reds, and Chicago Cubs
 Shipwreck Kelly, NFL halfback for the New York Giants and Brooklyn Dodgers
 Elizabeth Madox Roberts, poet and novelist
 Nancy Hanks Lincoln, mother of U.S. President Abraham Lincoln
 Thomas Lincoln, father of U.S. President Abraham Lincoln
 Georgia Davis Powers, Kentucky state legislator and civil rights activist
 Phil Simms, NFL quarterback, MVP of Super Bowl XXI, television commentator

Climate
The climate in this area is characterized by hot, humid summers and generally mild to cool winters.  According to the Köppen Climate Classification system, Springfield has a humid subtropical climate, abbreviated "Cfa" on climate maps.

References

External links
 Official website

 

 
Cities in Washington County, Kentucky
Cities in Kentucky
County seats in Kentucky
1793 establishments in Kentucky